This is the all-time roster for Major League Baseball's Kansas City Royals.



All-time roster
Key: RHOF, Royals Hall of Fame inductee; MSHOF, Missouri Sports Hall of Fame inductee

Players in Bold are members of the National Baseball Hall of Fame.

Players in Italics have had their numbers retired by the team.

A

Paul Abbott, SP, 2003
Brent Abernathy, 2B, 2003
Ted Abernathy, P, 1970–72
Tony Abreu, IF, 2012
Jerry Adair, 2B, 1969–70
Nathan Adcock, P, 2011–12
Jeremy Affeldt, P, 2002–06
Willie Aikens, 1B, 1980–83
Scott Alexander, P, 2015–present
Al Alburquerque, P, 2017
Luis Alcaraz, 2B, 1969–70
Luis Alicea, 2B, DH, IF, 2001–02
Jermaine Allensworth, OF, 1998
Miguel Almonte, P, 2015, 2017–present
Chip Ambres, OF, 2005
Brian Anderson, P, 2003–05
Josh Anderson, CF, 2009
Rick Anderson, P, 1987–88
Scott Anderson, SP, 1995
Steve Andrade, P, 2006
Norm Angelini, P, 1972–73
Rick Ankiel, OF, 2010
Norichika Aoki, OF, 2014
Kevin Appier, SP, 1989–99, 2003–04
Luis Aquino, P, 1988–92
Mike Armstrong, P, 1982–83
Miguel Asencio, SP, 2002–03
Tucker Ashford, 3B, 1984
Jeff Austin, P, 2001–02
Mike Avilés, SS, 2008–11

B

Cory Bailey, 2001–02
Paul Bako, C, 2006
Steve Balboni, 1B, DH, 1984–88
John Bale, P, 2007–09
Jay Baller, P, 1990
Scott Bankhead, SP, 1986
Brian Bannister, SP, 2007–10
Floyd Bannister, SP, 1988–89
Brian Barber, SP, 1998–99
German Barranca, 2B, 3B, 1979–80
Randy Bass, 1B, 1978
Miguel Batista, SP, 2000
Denny Bautista, SP, 2004–06
José Bautista, 3B, OF, 2004
Jonah Bayliss, P, 2005
Joe Beckwith, P, 1984–85
Tim Belcher, SP, 1996–98
Stan Belinda, P, 1993–94
Jay Bell, SS, 1997
Terry Bell, C, 1986
Carlos Beltrán, OF, 1998–2004
Juan Beníquez, OF, IF, DH, 1987
Yamil Benítez, OF, 1997
Todd Benzinger, 1B, 1991
Juan Berenguer, P, 1981, 1992
Brandon Berger, OF, 2001–04
Adam Bernero, SP, 2006
Ángel Berroa, SS, 2001–07
Sean Berry, 3B, 1990–91
Yuniesky Betancourt, SS, 2009–10, '12
Wilson Betemit, 3B,  2010–11
Kurt Bevacqua, IF, OF, DH, 1973–74
Brian Bevil, P, 1996–98
Buddy Biancalana, SS, 2B, 1982–87
Doug Bird, P, 1973–78
Bud Black, SP, 1982–88
Andrés Blanco, SS, 2B, 2004–06
Gregor Blanco, OF, 2010
Willie Bloomquist, OF, SS, 2009–10
Vida Blue, SP, 1982–83
Jaime Bluma, P, 1996
Doug Bochtler, P, 2000
Mike Boddicker, SP 1991–92
Ricky Bones, P, 1997–98
Emilio Bonifacio, 2B, 2013
Jorge Bonifacio, OF, 2017–present
Chris Booker, P, 2006
Bob Boone, C, 1989–90; Manager, 1995–97
Pat Borders, C, 1995
Thad Bosley, OF, DH, 1987–88
Derek Botelho, P, 1982
Ricky Bottalico, P, 2000
Jason Bourgeois, OF, 2012
Ryan Braun, P, 2006–07
Steve Braun, OF, 3B, DH, 1978–80
Craig Brazell, 1B, 2007
 #5 George Brett, 3B, 1B, DH, 1973–93, RHOF, MSHOF
Ken Brett, P, 1980–81
Billy Brewer, P, 1993–95
Mike Brewer, OF, 1986
Nelson Briles, SP, 1974–75
Juan Brito, C, 2002
Hubie Brooks, OF, DH, 1B, 1993–94
Adrian Brown, OF, 2004
Dee Brown, OF, DH, 1998–2004
Emil Brown, OF, 2005–07
Tom Browning, SP, 1995
Jonathan Broxton, P, 2012
Tom Bruno, P, 1976
Bob Buchanan, P, 1989
Ryan Buchter, P, 2017–present
John Buck, C, 2004–09
Bill Buckner, DH, 1B, 1988–89
Billy Buckner, P, 2007
Francisley Bueno, P, 2012–14
Ryan Bukvich, P, 2002–04
Bryan Bullington, P, 2010
Melvin Bunch, P, 1995
Wally Bunker, SP, 1969–71
Tom Burgmeier, P, 1969–73
Ambiorix Burgos, P, 2005–06
Enrique Burgos, P, 1993
Morgan Burkhart, 1B, DH, 2003
Billy Burns (baseball), OF, 2016–present
Steve Busby, SP, 1972–76, 1978–80, RHOF (1986)
Drew Butera, C, 2015–present
Bill Butler, SP, 1969–71
Billy Butler, DH, 1B, 2007–2014
Paul Byrd, SP, 2001–02
Tim Byrdak, P, 1998–2000

C

Melky Cabrera, OF, 2011, 2017–present
Edgar Cáceres, 2B, IF, 1995
Greg Cadaret, P, 1993
Trevor Cahill, P, 2017–present
Lorenzo Cain, OF, 2011–present
Alberto Callaspo, 2B, 3B, 2008–10
Shawn Camp, P, 2004–05
Jim Campanis, C, 1969–70
Jim Campbell, SP, 1990
Nick Capra, OF, 1988
José Cardenal, OF, 1980
D. J. Carrasco, P, 2003–05
Héctor Carrasco, P, 1997
Jamey Carroll, 2B, 2013
Lance Carter, P, 1999
Mike Caruso, SS, 2B, 3B, 2002
Larry Casian, P, 1997
Alberto Castillo, C, 2004–05
Manny Castillo, 3B, 2B, DH, 1980
Bill Castro, P, 1982–83
Orlando Cepeda, DH, 1974
Jaime Cerda, P, 2004–05
Dave Chalk, 3B, 2B, 1980–81
Craig Chamberlain, SP, 1979–80
Endy Chávez, OF, 2001
Jesse Chavez, P, 2010–11
Bruce Chen, P, 2009–14
Gary Christenson, P, 1979–80
Pedro Ciriaco, IF, 2013–14
Galen Cisco, P, 1969
Dave Clark, OF, DH, 1991
Terry Clark, P, 1996
Stan Clarke, SP, 1989
Lance Clemons, P, 1971
Chris Codiroli, P, 1990
Tony Cogan, P, 2001
Jim Colborn, SP, 1977–78
Stu Cole, 2B, SS, 1991
Louis Coleman, P, 2011–15
Vince Coleman, OF, 1994–95
Tim Collins, P, 2011–14
Christian Colón, IF, 2014–17
Román Colón, P, 2009–10, '12
Onix Concepción, SS, 2B, 1980–85
David Cone, SP, 1986, 1993–94
Jeff Conine, OF, 1B, 1990, 1992, 1998
Jim Converse, P, 1995, 1997
Brent Cookson, OF, 1995
Scott Cooper, 3B, 1B, DH, 1997
Archie Corbin, P, 1991
Fernando Cortez, 2B, 2007
Shane Costa,* OF, 2005–07
Al Cowens,†, OF, 1974–79
Jerry Cram, P, 1969, 1976
Steve Crawford, P, 1989–91
Keith Creel, P, 1982–83
Dave Cripe, 3B, 1978
Coco Crisp, OF, 2009
Warren Cromartie, 1B, OF, 1991
Aaron Crow, P, 2011–14
Juan Cruz, P, 2009–10
Todd Cruz, SS, 3B, 1979
Tony Cruz, C, 2016
Cheslor Cuthbert, 3B, 2015–present

D

Jeff D'Amico, P, 2000
Bruce Dal Canton, SP, 1971–1975
Johnny Damon, OF, 1995–2000
Kyle Davies, SP, 2007–2011
Butch Davis, OF, 1983–1984
Chili Davis, DH, 1997
John Davis, P, 1987
Mark Davis, P, 1990–1992
Storm Davis, P, 1990–1991
Tommy Davis, DH, 1976
Wade Davis, P, 2013–16
Travis Dawkins, 2B, 2003
Roland de la Maza, P, 1997
Jorge de la Rosa, P, 2006–2007
Luis de los Santos, 1B, DH, 1988–1989
Rick DeHart, P, 2003
David DeJesus, OF, 2003–2010
José DeJesús, P, 1988–1989, 1994
Wilson Delgado, 2B, SS, 3B, 2000–2001
Chris Demaria, P, 2005
Bucky Dent, SS, 3B, 1984
Elmer Dessens, P, 2006
Bob Detherage, OF, 1980
Joselo Díaz, P, 2006
Matt Diaz, OF, DH, 2005
Mike DiFelice, C, 2003
Lenny DiNardo, P, 2009
Frank DiPino, P, 1993
Scott Dohmann, P, 2006
Octavio Dotel, P, 2007
Richard Dotson, SP, 1990
Moe Drabowsky, P, 1969–1970
Dick Drago, P, 1969–1973
Brandon Duckworth, P, 2006–2008
Danny Duffy, SP, 2011–2021
Todd Dunwoody, OF, DH, 2000
Chad Durbin, SP, 1999–2002
Chris Dwyer, P, 2013
Jermaine Dye, OF, 1997–2001
Jarrod Dyson, OF, 2010–16

E

Rawly Eastwick, P, 1980
Craig Eaton, P, 1979
Brett Eibner, OF, 2016
Jim Eisenreich, OF, DH, 1987–92
Scott Elarton, SP, 2006–07
Luis Encarnación, P, 1990
Alcides Escobar, SS, 2011–present
Seth Etherton, SP, 2006
Bart Evans, P, 1998

F

Jorge Fábregas, C, 2000
Irving Falu, IF, 2012–2013
Kyle Farnsworth, P, 2009–10
Steve Farr, P, 1985–90
Sal Fasano, C, 1996–99, 2001
Carlos Febles, 2B, 1998–2003
Neftalí Feliz, P, 2017–present
Tony Ferreira, P, 1985
Nate Field, P, 2002–05
Josh Fields, 3B, 2010
Pete Filson, SP, 1990
Mike Fiore, 1B, OF, 1969–70
Al Fitzmorris, SP, 1969–76
Dave Fleming, P, 1995
Bobby Floyd, SS, 2B, 3B, 1970–74
Brian Flynn, P , 2016–present
Steve Foucault, P, 1978
Joe Foy, 3B, OF, IF, 1969
Jeff Francis, SP, 2011
Jeff Francoeur, OF, 2011–13
Ryan Freel, OF, 2009
Dave Frost, SP, 1982
Jeff Fulchino, P, 2008
Chris Fussell, P, 1999–2000

G

Gary Gaetti, 3B, 1B, DH, 1993–95
Greg Gagne, SS, 1993–95
Rich Gale, SP, 1978–81
Gene Garber, P, 1973–74, 1987–88
Danny Garcia, OF, 1B, 1981
Mark Gardner, SP, 1993
Wes Gardner, P, 1991
Joey Gathright, OF, 2006–08
Jim Gaudet, C, 1978–79
Dillon Gee, P, 2016
Chris George, SP, 2001–04
Esteban Germán, 2B, 3B, OF, 2006–08
César Gerónimo, OF, 1981–83
Byron Gettis, OF, 2004
Chris Getz, 2B, 2010–2013
Jeremy Giambi, DH, 1B, OF, 1998–99
Kirk Gibson, OF, DH, 1991
Johnny Giavotella, 2B, 2011–13
Jason Gilfillan, P, 2003
Jerry Don Gleaton, P, 1987–89
Ross Gload, 1B, 2007–08
Jimmy Gobble, P, 2003–08
Alexis Gómez, OF, 2002, 2004
Fernando González, 3B, 1974
Juan González, OF, 2004
Tom Goodwin, OF, 1994–97
Alex Gordon, 3B, OF, 2007–present
Tom Gordon, SP, 1988–95
Terrance Gore, OF, 2014–present
Rubén Gotay, 2B, 2004–05
Tony Graffanino, 2B, IF, 2004–05, 2006
Jeff Granger, P, 1993–94, 1996
Zack Greinke, SP, 2004–10
Jason Grimsley, P, 2001–04
Jerry Grote, C, 1981
Jeff Grotewold, DH, 1B, 1995
Mark Grudzielanek, 2B, 2006–08
Mark Gubicza, SP, 1984–96, RHOF (2006)
Wilton Guerrero, IF, OF, 2004
Aaron Guiel, OF, 1B, 2002–06
José Guillén, RF, 2008–10
Dave Gumpert, P, 1987
Larry Gura, SP, 1976–85, RHOF (1992)
Jeremy Guthrie, P, 2012–15
Juan Gutiérrez, P, 2013
Chris Gwynn, OF, DH, 1992–93

H

John Habyan, P, 1993
Tom Hall, P, 1976–77
Shane Halter, IF, OF, 1997–98
Bob Hamelin, DH, 1B, 1993–96
Atlee Hammaker, SP, 1981
Jason Hammel, SP, 2017–present
Steve Hammond, OF, 1982
Chris Haney, SP, 1992–98
Jed Hansen, 2B, IF, OF, 1997–99
Ron Hansen, SS, 3B, 2B, 1972
Alan Hargesheimer, P, 1986
Billy Harris, 2B, 1969
Chuck Harrison, 1B, 1969, 1971
Ken Harvey, 1B, DH, 2001, 2003–05
Andy Hassler, SP, 1976–78
Chris Hatcher, OF, 1998
Brett Hayes, C, 2013–14
Fran Healy, C, 1969, 1973–76
Ed Hearn, C, 1987–88
Kelly Heath, 2B, 1982
Neal Heaton, P, 1992
Mike Hedlund, SP, 1969–72
Bob Hegman, 2B, 1985
Bob Heise, IF, 1977
Dave Henderson, OF, DH, 1994
Doug Henry, P, 2001
Jackie Hernández, SS, 1969–70
Luis Hernández, SS, 2009
Roberto Hernández, P, 2001–02
Runelvys Hernández, SP, 2002–03, 2005–06
Kelvin Herrera, P, 2011–present
Phil Hiatt, 3B, OF, DH, 1993, 1995
Jeremy Hill, P, 2002–03
A. J. Hinch, C, 2001–02
Luke Hochevar, P, 2007–16
Dennis Hocking, 2B, 3B, SS, 2005
Joe Hoerner, P, 1973–74
Ray Holbert, SS, 2B, 3B, 1999–2000
Greg Holland, P, 2010–15
Don Hood, P, 1982–83
Gail Hopkins, 1B, DH, 1971–73
Eric Hosmer, 1B, 2011–present
Tommy Hottovy, P, 2012
Steve Hovley, OF, 1972–73
David Howard, SS, IF, OF, 1991–97
J.P. Howell, SP, 2005
 #10 Dick Howser, Manager, 1981–86; also played SS for the Kansas City Athletics, 1961–63; RHOF
Al Hrabosky, P, 1978–79
Trenidad Hubbard, OF, 2001
Justin Huber, 1B, DH, 2005–07
Luke Hudson, SP, 2006–07
Dusty Hughes, P, 2009–10
Justin Huisman, P, 2004
Rick Huisman, P, 1995–96
Mark Huismann, P, 1983–86
Tug Hulett, 2B, 2009
Philip Humber, P, 2010
Clint Hurdle, OF, 1B, 1977–81

I

Raúl Ibañez, OF, 1B, DH, 2001–03, 2014
Omar Infante, IF 2B, 2014–16
Dane Iorg, OF, 1B, DH, 1984–85
Tim Ireland, IF, OF, 1981–82

J

Bo Jackson, OF, DH, 1986–90, MSHOF
Damian Jackson, OF, 2B, DH, 2004
Danny Jackson, SP, 1983–87
Grant Jackson, P, 1982
Mike Jackson, P, 1972–73
Mike Jacobs, 1B, 2009
Jason Jacome, P, 1995–97
Chris James, DH, OF, 1995
Gregg Jefferies, 3B, 1992
Jeremy Jeffress, P, 2011–12
Steve Jeltz, IF, OF, 1990
Ryan Jensen, P, 2005
Bob Johnson, SP, 1970
Brian Johnson, C, 2000
Elliot Johnson, 2B, OF, 2013
Ron Johnson, 1B, C, 1982–83
Rondin Johnson, 2B, 1986
Rontrez Johnson, OF, 2003
Joel Johnston, P, 1991–92
Lynn Jones, OF, 1984–86
Mike Jones, P, 1980–81, 1984–85
Ross Jones, SS, 2B, 1987
Ruppert Jones, OF, 1976
Steve Jones, P, 1969
Félix José, OF, 1993–95
Donnie Joseph, P, 2013–14
Wally Joyner, 1B, 1992–95
Jake Junis, P, 2017–present

K

Kila Ka'aihue, 1B, 2008, 2010–11
Nate Karns, P, 2017–present
Greg Keatley, C, 1981
Pat Kelly, OF, 1969–70
Jason Kendall, C, 2010
Ian Kennedy, P, 2016–present
Joe Keough, OF, 1B, 1969–72
Bobby Keppel, SP, 2006
Jeff Keppinger, IF, OF, 2006
Harmon Killebrew, DH, 1B, 1975
Jeff King, 1B, DH, 1997–99
Mike Kingery, OF, 1986
Matt Kinney, P, 2004
Ed Kirkpatrick, C, OF, 1B, 1969–73
Chuck Knoblauch, OF, 2002
Bobby Knoop, 2B, 3B, 1971–72
Kevin Koslofski, OF, 1992–94
George Kottaras, C, 2013
Chad Kreuter, C, 1999
Art Kusnyer, C, 1978

L

Pete LaCock, 1B, OF, DH, 1977–80
Mike LaCoss, P, 1985
Joe Lahoud, OF, DH, 1977–78
Gary Lance, P, 1977
Andy Larkin, P, 2000
Jason LaRue, C, 2007
Rudy Law, OF, 1986
Brett Laxton, P, 2000
Terry Leach, P, 1989
Mark Lee, P, 1988
Dave Leeper, OF, 1984–85
Charlie Leibrandt, SP, 1984–89
Scott Leius, IF, DH, 1998–99
Patrick Lennon, OF, 1996
Dennis Leonard, SP, 1974–83, 1985–86, RHOF (1989), MSHOF
Anthony Lerew, P, 2009–10
Curt Leskanic, P, 2003–04
Al Levine, P, 2003
José Lima, SP, 2003, 2005
José Lind, 2B, 1993–95
Doug Linton, SP, 1995–96
Nelson Liriano, 2B, 1991
Mark Littell, P, 1973, 1975–77
Graeme Lloyd, P, 2003
Keith Lockhart, 2B, 3B, DH, 1995–96
Ryan Long, OF, 1997
Terrence Long, OF, 2005
Albie Lopez, P, 2003
Aurelio López, P, 1974
Mendy López, IF, OF, 1998–99, 2003–04
Nicky Lopez, IF, 2019-present
David Lough, OF, 2012–2013
Sean Lowe, P, 2003
Devon Lowery, P, 2008
Rick Luecken, P, 1989

M

Mike MacDougal, P, 2001–06
Mike Macfarlane, C, 1987–94, 1996–98
Shane Mack, OF, DH, 1998
Scotti Madison, C, 1B, OF, DH, 1987–88
Mike Magnante, P, 1991–96
Ron Mahay, P, 2008–09
Mitch Maier, OF, 2006–12
Carlos Maldonado, P, 1990–91
Eli Marrero, OF, 1B, 2005
Keith Marshall, OF, 1973
Víctor Marté, P, 2009–10
Jerry Martin, OF, 1982–83
Renie Martin, P, 1979–81
Buck Martinez, C, 1969–71, 1973–77
Carmelo Martínez, 1B, 1991
Felix Martinez, SS, 2B, 1997–99
Gary Martz, OF, 1975
Tom Matchick, SS, 2B, 1970
Rubén Mateo, OF, 2004
Terry Mathews, P, 1999
Julius Matos, 3B, 2B, SS, 2003
Brandon Maurer, P, 2017–present
Justin Maxwell, OF, 2013–14
Darrell May, SP, 2002–04
Jerry May, C, 1971–73
Lee May, 1B, DH, 1981–82
Lucas May, C, 2010
John Mayberry, 1B, DH, 1972–1977, RHOF (1996)
Brent Mayne, C, 1990–95, 2001–03
Joe Mays, SP, 2006
Vin Mazzaro, SP, 2011–12
Kevin McCarthy, P, 2016–present
David McCarty, 1B, OF, DH, 2000–02
Bob McClure, P, 1975–76
Mike McCormick, P, 1971
Lindy McDaniel, P, 1974–75
Allen McDill, P, 1997–98
Donzell McDonald, OF, 2002
Joe McEwing, IF, OF, DH, 2005
Andy McGaffigan, P, 1990–91
Randy McGilberry, P, 1977–78
Russ McGinnis, 1B, 3B, OF, 1995
Brian McRae, OF, 1990–94
Hal McRae, DH, OF, 1973–87; Manager, 1991–94; RHOF (1989), MSHOF
Kevin McReynolds, OF, 1992–93
Larry McWilliams, P, 1989–90
Rusty Meacham, P, 1992–95
Brian Meadows, SP, 2000–01
Gil Meche, P, 2007–10
Kris Medlen, P, 2015–16
Bob Melvin, C, 1B, 1992
Luis Mendoza, P, 2010–13
Henry Mercedes, C, 1995–96
Whit Merrifield, 2B, OF, 2016–present
Doug Mientkiewicz, 1B, 2006
José Mijares, P, 2012
Bob Milacki, SP, 1994
Jai Miller, OF, 2010
Keith Miller, 2B, 3B, OF, 1992–95
Alec Mills, P, 2016
Steve Mingori, P, 1973–79
Mike Minor, P, 2017–present
Dennis Moeller, SP, 1992
Raúl A. Mondesí, 2B, 2015–present
Aurelio Monteagudo, P, 1970
Jeff Montgomery, P, 1988–99 RHOF (2003)
Monty Montgomery, SP, 1971–72
Adam Moore, C, 2012–13
Bobby Moore, OF, 1991
Kendrys Morales, DH, 2015–16
Dave Morehead, P, 1969–70
Omar Moreno, OF, 1985
Orber Moreno, P, 1999
Alvin Morman, P, 1999
Russ Morman, 1B, OF, DH, 1990–91
Hal Morris, 1B, OF, DH, 1998
Brandon Moss, 1B, OF, DH, 2017–present
José Mota, 2B, 1995
Darryl Motley, OF, 1981, 1983–86
Mike Moustakas, 3B, 2011–2019
Peter Moylan, P, 2016–present
Scott Mullen, P, 2000–03
Rance Mulliniks, SS, 2B, 3B, 1980–81
Donnie Murphy, 2B, SS, 2004–05
Tom Murphy, P, 1972
Dan Murray, P, 1999–2000
Neal Musser, P, 2007–08
Rod Myers, OF, 1996–97

N

Daniel Nava, OF, 2016
Yamaico Navarro, 3B, 2011
Dave Nelson, 2B, DH, 1976–77
Joe Nelson, P, 2006
Roger Nelson, SP, 1969–72
Jim Nettles, OF, 1979
Josh Newman, P, 2008
Hideo Nomo, P, 2008
Les Norman, OF, DH, 1995–96
Scott Northey, OF, 1969
Abraham Núñez, OF, 2004
Jon Nunnally, OF, 1995–97

O

Don O'Riley, P, 1969–70
Sean O'Sullivan, SP, 2010–11
Wes Obermueller, SP, 2002
Jake Odorizzi, P, 2012
José Offerman, 2B, 1B, SS, 1996–98
Bob Oliver, 1B, 3B, OF 1969–72
Miguel Olivo, C, 2008–09
Gregg Olson, P, 1995
Luis Ordaz, 2B, SS, 3B, 2000–02
Paulo Orlando, OF, 2015–present
Jorge Orta, DH, OF, 1984–87
Frank Ortenzio, 1B, 1973
Héctor Ortiz, C, 1998, 2000–01
Amos Otis, CF, 1970–83, RHOF (1986)
Juan Carlos Oviedo, P, 2005–08
Dave Owen, SS, 1988
Larry Owen, C, 1987–88

P

Dennis Paepke, C, OF, 1969, 1971–72, 1974
Rey Palacios, C, 3B, 1B, 1988–90
Dean Palmer, 3B, 1987–88
Felipe Paulino, SP, 2011–12
Craig Paquette, 3B, OF, 1B, SS, 1996–97
John Parrish, P, 2010
Bill Paschall, P, 1978–79, 1981
Cliff Pastornicky, 3B, 1983
Fred Patek, SS, 1971–79, RHOF (1992), MSHOF
Jarrod Patterson, 3B, 1B, DH, 2003
Marty Pattin, P, 1974–80
Bill Pecota, IF, OF, 1986–91
Jorge Pedre, C, 1B, 1991
Kit Pellow, 3B, 1B, DH, 2002
Brayan Peña, C, 2009–12
Carlos Peña, 1B, 2013
Tony Peña Jr., SS, 2007–09
Terry Pendleton, DH, 3B, 1998
Joel Peralta, P, 2006–08
Mélido Pérez, SP, 1987
Mike Pérez, P, 1997
Neifi Pérez, SS, 2001–02
Odalis Pérez, SP, 2006–07
Richard Perez, 2B, 1987
Salvador Pérez, C, 2011–present
Chan Perry, 1B, 2002
Gaylord Perry, SP, 1983 (14 games, his last season), MSHOF
Gerald Perry, DH, 1B, 1990
Mark Persico, C,  3B, 1989
Ken Phelps, DH, 1B, 1980–81
Paul Phillips, C, 1B, 2004–06
Hipólito Pichardo, P, 1992–98
Calvin Pickering, DH, 1B, 2004–05
Ed Pierce, P, 1992
Manny Piña, C, 2011–12
Lou Piniella, OF, 1969–73
Vada Pinson, OF, 1974–75
Marc Pisciotta, P, 1999
Jim Pittsley, P, 1995, 1997–99
Scott Podsednik, OF, 2010
Sidney Ponson, P, 2009
Tom Poquette, OF, 1973, 1976–79, 1982
Darrell Porter, C, DH, 1977–80
Scott Pose, OF, DH, 1999–2000
Ted Power, P, 1988
Tom Prince, C, 2003
Greg Pryor, IF, 1982–86
Tim Pugh, P, 1996
Terry Puhl, OF, DH, 1991
Luis Pujols, C, 1984
Harvey Pulliam, OF, 1991–93

Q

Mark Quinn, OF, DH, 1999–2002
Humberto Quintero, C, 2012
Jamie Quirk, C, IF, OF, 1975–76, 1978–82, 1985–88
Dan Quisenberry,P, 1979–88, RHOF (1998), MSHOF

R

Jason Rakers, P, 2000
Horacio Ramírez, P, 2008–09
Ramón Ramírez, P, 2008
Joe Randa, 3B, 1995–96, 1999–2004
Pat Rapp, SP, 1998
Dennis Rasmussen, P, 1992–93, 1995
Eric Rasmussen, SP, 1983
Ken Ray, P, 1999
Barry Raziano, P, 1973
Jeff Reboulet, 2B, 3B, SS, 2000
Mark Redman, SP, 2006
Rick Reed, SP, 1992–93
Rick Reichardt, DH, OF, 1973–74
Dan Reichert, P, 1999–2002
Bryan Rekar, P, 2002
Desi Relaford, IF, OF, 2003–04
Steve Renko, SP, 1983
Dennys Reyes, P, 2004
Fred Rico, OF, 1969
Brad Rigby, P, 1999–2000
Danny Rios, P, 1998
Juan Ríos, 2B, SS, 1969
David Riske, P, 2007
Bombo Rivera, OF, 1982
Luis Rivera, SS, 2B, 3B, 1998
Bip Roberts, OF, 2B, 3B, 1996–97
Leon Roberts, OF, 1983–84
Clint Robinson, PH, 2012
Kenny Robinson,†, P, 1996
Kerry Robinson, OF, 2006
Eduardo Rodríguez, P, 1979
Ellie Rodríguez, C, 1969–70
Cookie Rojas, 2B, 1970–77; RHOF (1987)
Jim Rooker, SP, 1969–72
Carlos Rosa, RP, 2008–09
José Rosado, SP, 1996–2000
Rico Rossy, SS, 2B, 3B, 1992–93
Josh Rupe, P, 2010
Glendon Rusch, SP, 1997–99
Mark Ryal, OF, 1982

S

Bret Saberhagen, SP, 1984–91, RHOF (2005)
Ray Sadecki, P, 1975–76
Donnie Sadler, IF, OF, 2001–02
Ángel Salazar, SS, 1986–87
Bill Sampen, P, 1992–93
Juan Samuel, OF, 2B, 1992, 1995
Ángel Sánchez, 2B, SS, 2006
Jonathan Sánchez, P, 2012
Israel Sánchez, P, 1988, 1990
Orlando Sánchez, C, 1984
Rey Sánchez, SS, 1999–2001
Ken Sanders, P, 1976
Reggie Sanders, OF, 2006–07
Ervin Santana, P, 2013
Benito Santiago, C, 2004
José Santiago, P, 1997–2001
Nelson Santovenia, C, 1993
Rich Sauveur, P, 1992
Ted Savage, OF, 1971
Bob Scanlan, P, 1996
Steve Scarsone, IF, 1999
Paul Schaal, 3B, 1969–74
Jeff Schattinger, P, 1981
Dan Schatzeder, P, 1991
Richie Scheinblum, 1972, 1974
Jeff Schulz, OF, 1989–90
George Scott, 1B, 1979
Rodney Scott, 2B, SS, 1975
Jim Scranton, SS, 3B, 1984–85
Rudy Seánez, P, 2004
Shawn Sedlacek, SP, 2002
Kevin Seitzer, 3B, 1B, 1986–91
Jimmy Serrano, P, 2004
Scott Service, P, 1997–99
Rich Severson, SS, 2B, 1970–71
Ryan Shealy, 1B, 2006–08
Pat Sheridan, OF, 1981, 1983–85
James Shields, P, 2013–2014
Steve Shields, P, 1986
Steve Shifflett, P, 1992
Bob Shirley, P, 1987
Brian Shouse, P, 2002
Terry Shumpert, 2B, 3B, 1990–94
Luis Silverio, OF, 1978
Joe Simpson, 1B, OF, 1983
Wayne Simpson, P, 1973
Andrew Sisco, P, 2005–06
Eric Skoglund, P, 2017–present
Don Slaught, C, 1982–84
Daryl Smith, P, 1990
Jason Smith, IF, 2007–08
Lonnie Smith, OF, 1985–87
Will Smith, P, 2012–2013
Kyle Snyder, P, 2003, 2005–06
Tony Solaita,†, 1B, DH, 1974–76
Jorge Soler, OF, 2017–present
Joakim Soria, P, 2007–11, 2016–present
Billy Sorrell, 3B, OF, 1B, 1970
Tim Spehr, C, 1991, 1997, 1998–99
Paul Splittorff, SP, 1970–84, MSHOF
Paul Spoljaric, P, 2000
Jerry Spradlin, P, 2000
George Spriggs, OF, 1969–70
Matt Stairs, 1B, DH, OF, 2004–06
Jason Standridge, P, 2007
Blake Stein, P, 1999–2002
Steve Stemle, P, 2005–06
Andy Stewart, C, 1997
Kurt Stillwell, SS, 1988–91
Kelly Stinnett, C, 2004
Bob Stinson, C, 1975–76
Bob Stoddard, P, 1987
Mel Stottlemyre Jr., P, 1990
Matt Strahm, P, 2016–17
Chris Stynes, 2B, OF, 1995–96
Scott Sullivan, P, 2004
Jim Sundberg, C, 1985–86
Jeff Suppan, SP, 1999–2002
Larry Sutton, OF, 1B, 1997–98
Mac Suzuki, P, 1999–2001, 2002
Mike Sweeney, 1B, DH, C, 1995–2007

T

Pat Tabler, OF, 1B, DH, 1989–1990
Danny Tartabull, OF, 1987–91
Carl Taylor, C, OF, 1B, 1971–73
Dwight Taylor, OF, 1986
Hawk Taylor, OF, C, PH, 1969–70
Everett Teaford, P, 2011–13
Mark Teahen, 3B, OF, 1B 2005–09
Miguel Tejada, 2B, 2013
Robinson Tejeda, P, 2008–11
Jerry Terrell, IF, OF, P, 1978–1980
Kanekoa Texeira, P, 2010–11
Brad Thompson, P, 2010
Rich Thompson, OF, 2004
John Thomson, P, 2007
George Throop, P, 1975, 1977–79
Gary Thurman, OF, 1987–92
Brett Tomko, P, 2008
Mike Tonis, C, 2004
Dilson Torres, P, 1995
Ramón Torres, IF, 2017–present
Rusty Torres, OF, 1980
Matt Treanor, C, 2011
Michael Tucker, OF, 1995–96, 2002–03
Bob Tufts, P, 1982–83
Matt Tupman, C, 2008
Chris Turner, C, 1998
Jeff Twitty, P, 1980

V

Sandy Valdespino, OF, 1971
Julio Valera, P, 1996
Jason Vargas, P, 2014–present
Jorge Vásquez, P, 2004
Yordano Ventura, P, 2013–16
Ryan Verdugo, P, 2012
Randy Veres, P, 1997
Eduardo Villacis, P, 2004
Joe Vitiello, 1B, OF, 1995–99
Edinson Vólquez, P, 2015–16
Brad Voyles, P, 2001–03

W

Doug Waechter, P, 2009
Héctor Wagner, SP, 1990–91
Jamie Walker, P, 1997–98
Derek Wallace, P, 1999
Les Walrond, P, 2003
Chien-Ming Wang, P, 2016
U.L. Washington, SS, 1977–84
Dusty Wathan, C, 2002
John Wathan, C, 1B, OF, 1976–85; Manager, 1987–1991
Jim Webb, P,1970–1971
Todd Wellemeyer, P, 2006–07
Brad Wellman, 2B, SS, 3B, 1988–89
Kip Wells, P, 2008
Don Wengert, P, 1999
Dennis Werth, C, 1B, 1982
Matt Whisenant, P, 1997–99
 #20 Frank White, 2B, 1973–90, RHOF, MSHOF
Rondell White, OF, 2003
Dave Wickersham, P, 1969
Curtis Wilkerson, 2B, SS, 3B, 1992–93
Mike Williams, P, 1997
Mitch Williams, P, 1997
Frank Wills, P, 1983–84
Craig Wilson, 3B, 1993
Kris Wilson, P, 2000–03
Willie Wilson, CF, 1976–90, RHOF (2000), MSHOF
Matt Winters, OF, 1989
Jay Witasick, SP, 1999–2000
Jim Wohlford, OF, 1972–76
Blake Wood, P, 2010–11
Mike Wood, P, 2004–06
Travis Wood, P, 2017
Jamey Wright, SP, 2003, 2009
Jim Wright, P, 1981–82
Ken Wright, P, 1970–73

Y

Yasuhiko Yabuta, P, 2008–09
Jim York, P, 1970–71
Chris Young, P, 2015–17
Curt Young, P, 1992
Ernie Young, OF, 1998
Kevin Young, 1B, 3B, OF, 1996

Z

Chris Zachary, P, 1969
Gregg Zaun, C, 2000–01
Joe Zdeb, OF, 1977–79
Ben Zobrist, 2B, 2015
Paul Zuvella, 3B, 1991

See also
Major League Baseball rosters
Kansas City Royals
Kansas City Royals award winners and league leaders
Kansas City Royals records – statistical records and milestone achievements

External links
Baseball-Reference.com: Kansas City Royals Batting Register and Pitching Register

Roster
Major League Baseball all-time rosters